Botswana competed at the 2013 World Championships in Athletics in Moscow, Russia, from 10–18 August 2013. A team of 11 athletes was announced to represent the country in the event.

Medallists
The following Botswana competitors won medals at the Championships

Results
(q – qualified, NM – no mark, SB – season best)

Men
Track and road events

Field events

Women

References

External links
IAAF World Championships – Botswana

Nations at the 2013 World Championships in Athletics
World Championships in Athletics
Botswana at the World Championships in Athletics